The following is a list of episodes of the British teen drama Skins. For a plot summary of the episodes, visit the main article of each series.

Series overview

Episodes

Series 1 (2007)

Series 2 (2008)

Series 3 (2009)

Series 4 (2010)

Series 5 (2011)

Series 6 (2012)

Series 7 (2013)

Character Video Diaries

Series 1 (Generation 1)

Also to accompany the series, online video diaries were created for the following characters.

Series 3 (Generation 2)

The character video diaries functionally replaced Unseen Skins for the third series. A new diary was posted on the E4 website following the broadcast of each episode, and the diary often pertained to the events of that episode.

The Lost Weeks

To explain what had happened to each character between series 1 and 2, a series of videos called "The Lost Weeks" were aired exclusively on E4.com. The episodes are as follows:

Although several of these videos bear the same name as a character video diary they are two separate videos.

Ratings

References

External links
List of 

Channel 4-related lists
Lists of British LGBT-related television series episodes
Lists of British teen drama television series episodes